Bhusawal Thermal Power Station is located 8 km away from Bhusawal city of Jalgaon district in Maharashtra.The name of place where it is located is Deepnagar, which means City of Lights. The power plant is a coal based power plants of Mahagenco.

Plant
Bhusawal thermal power station has an installed capacity of 1210 MW. The first unit was commissioned in 1968. Mahagenco has further contracted BHEL for setting up of sixth unit of rated capacity 660 MW.

Supply
Coal-based thermal power stations consume large quantities of coal. For example, the Bhusawal Thermal Power Station consumed 2,400,000 tonnes of coal in 2006–07. Around 80 per cent of the domestic coal supplies in India are meant for coal based thermal power plants and coal transportation forms 42 per cent of the total freight earnings of Indian railways.

References

External links

 Bhusawal Thermal Power Station at SourceWatch

Coal-fired power stations in Maharashtra
Bhusawal
1968 establishments in Maharashtra
Energy infrastructure completed in 1968
20th-century architecture in India